Almorexant, also known by its development code ACT-078573, is an orexin antagonist, acting as a competitive antagonist of the OX1 and OX2 orexin receptors, which was being developed by the pharmaceutical companies Actelion and GSK for the treatment of insomnia. Development of the drug was abandoned in January 2011 due to concerns over the  hepatic safety of almorexant after transient increases in liver enzymes were observed in trials.

Pharmacology

Pharmacodynamics
Almorexant is a competitive, dual OX1 and OX2 receptor antagonist and selectively inhibits the functional consequences of OX1 and OX2 receptor activation, such as intracellular Ca2+ mobilization. It dissociates very slowly from the orexin receptors and this may prolong its duration of action.

History
Originally developed by Actelion, from 2007 almorexant was being reported as a potential blockbuster drug, as its novel mechanism of action (orexin receptor antagonism) was thought to produce better quality sleep and fewer side effects than the traditional benzodiazepines and Z-drugs which dominated the multibillion-dollar insomnia medication market.

In 2008, GlaxoSmithKline bought the development and marketing rights for almorexant from Actelion for an initial payment of $147 million. The deal would have been worth an estimated $3.2 billion if the drug had successfully completed clinical development and obtained FDA approval. GSK and Actelion continued to develop the drug together, and completed a Phase III clinical trial in November 2009.

However, in January 2011 Actelion and GSK announced they were abandoning the development of almorexant because of its side effect profile.

Society and culture

Names
Almorexant is the generic name of the drug and its . It is also known by its former developmental code name ACT-078573.

References

External links
 Actelion's official website

Abandoned drugs
Acetamides
Norsalsolinol ethers
Orexin antagonists
Sedatives
Trifluoromethyl compounds